Taierzhuang Road is a station on Line 9 of the Shanghai Metro. It began passenger trial operation with the rest of phase 3 of Line 9, an easterly extension with 9 new stations, on December 30, 2017.

Name
Under Hanyu Pinyin conventions, the correct transliteration of this name should contain an apostrophe, being Tai'erzhuang Road.

References 

Railway stations in Shanghai
Shanghai Metro stations in Pudong
Railway stations in China opened in 2017
Line 9, Shanghai Metro